The 1958 Pacific typhoon season was an event in the annual cycle of tropical cyclone formation. The season had no official bounds, but tropical cyclones in the Western Pacific Ocean normally develop between May and October. The season was below average in storms, with only twenty-three, but there were a high 21 typhoons. In addition to these, there were also nine tropical storms tracked only by the JMA. The season began very early, with a very rare super typhoon in January, Ophelia, and ended in early December with Typhoon Olga.

The scope of this article is limited to the Pacific Ocean, north of the equator and west of the international date line. Storms that form east of the date line and north of the equator are called hurricanes; see 1958 Pacific hurricane season. Tropical Storms formed in the entire west pacific basin were assigned a name by the Fleet Weather Center on Guam.

Systems

Typhoon Ophelia 

On January 7, the relatively small tropical storm struck Jaluit Atoll within the southern Marshall Islands, killing 14 people. It rapidly intensified, and reached winds of  the next day. Conditions became unfavorable, and steadily weakened to  winds. Ponape was struck on January 10, where Ophelia tore off the roof of the United States Weather Bureau office. On January 11, Truk was struck. The Weather Bureau's inflation shelter was destroyed, with other buildings on site severely damaged. Ophelia severely impacted Yap, removing the Weather Bureau office's sheet metal roof and damaging the inflation building, theodolite, and radio antenna. After maintaining that intensity for 18 hours, it quickly weakened as it drifted northward, and dissipated on the 17th. Typhoon Ophelia caused widespread damage on several islands of the Western Pacific. Ophelia also killed nine people when a USAF WB-50 crashed during a recon flight into the storm on January 15.

JMA Tropical Storm Two 

Tropical Storm 02 developed on April 29. It struck Philippines before dissipating on the following day.

Typhoon Phyllis 

Phyllis remained over open waters, and dissipated on the 2nd to the southeast of Japan. Phyllis's record was surpassed by Typhoon Damrey in 2000, and later Typhoon Noul in 2015.

JMA Tropical Storm Four 

Tropical Storm 04 developed in the South China Sea on May 26. It struck the Chinese province of Guangdong and Hainan, before dissipating on June 6.

Typhoon Rita 

Typhoon Rita existed from June 7 to June 13 in which it didn't bring any significant damage to land.

JMA Tropical Storm Six 

Tropical Storm 06 developed on June 8. It crossed the Ryukyu Islands of Japan, before dissipating on June 13.

Typhoon Susan 

Typhoon Susan existed from June 13 to June 17.

Typhoon Tess 

Typhoon Tess developed in the vicinity of the Federated States of Micronesia on June 28. The storm moved generally west-northwestward and northwestward, reaching the Ryukyu Islands before dissipating on July 6.

Typhoon Viola 

Typhoon Viola existed from July 8 to July 14.

Typhoon Winnie 

Tropical Storm Winnie formed on July 12 to the east of Luzon. It moved northwestward, rapidly intensifying to a Category 4 typhoon within 12 hours. The typhoon weakened slightly, but rapidly strengthened to a  super typhoon just before hitting eastern Taiwan on the 15th. Winnie rapidly weakened over the mountainous terrain, and after crossing the Formosa Strait Winnie hit southeastern China. It continued to weaken over land, and dissipated on the 17th. Winnie caused 31 casualties and 53 injuries in Taiwan while crossing.

Typhoon Betty 

Typhoon Betty existed in the South China Sea from July 13 to July 16.

Typhoon Alice 

Tropical Storm Alice developed on July 14 in the open western Pacific Ocean. It moved to the northwest and attained typhoon status on the 16th. Alice rapidly intensified on the 19th to a  super typhoon, and after turning to the northeast it weakened. Alice hit southeastern Japan on the 22nd, and became extratropical on the 24th near the Kamchatka Peninsula. 

Shortly after Typhoon Alice made landfall, storm surges occurred in Tokyo Bay, causing floods in Kōtō and Edogawa on Shitamachi region. In the area of Kameido (now a station), storm surge in Tokyo Bay reached 2.89 meters in height. Storm surges caused flooding of rivers around Tokyo Bay that damaged 21 ships, damaged 27,673 hectare of crops, destroyed 1,089 and inundated 46,243 houses. Alice caused the deaths of 26 people in total, injuring 64 people and 14 people went missing.

JMA Tropical Storm Fourteen 

Tropical Storm Fourteen developed in the South China Sea on July 19. It struck Fujian before dissipating on July 25.

Typhoon Doris 

Typhoon Doris existed from July 22 to July 29.

JMA Tropical Storm Sixteen 

Typhoon 16 developed in the South China Sea on August 5. It struck China before dissipating on August 11.

Typhoon Elsie 

Typhoon Elsie existed from August 4 to August 9.

Typhoon Flossie 

On August 21, a tropical depression formed in the open ocean and moved northward. It reached tropical storm status later that day, and attained typhoon strength on the 22nd. Flossie turned to the east, and after becoming extratropical on the 26th the storm dissipated on the 27th. The storm caused 15 casualties (with 30 missing) and 39 injuries in Tokyo.

JMA Tropical Storm Eighteen 

Tropical Storm 18 existed from August 25 to August 31.

Typhoon Grace 

Another typhoon developed in the vicinity of the Federated States of Micronesia on August 29. The system moved northwestward and eventually strengthened into a super typhoon. It later struck Zhejiang before becoming extratropical on September 5.

JMA Tropical Storm Twenty 

Tropical Storm 24 existed from September 2 to September 13.

Typhoon Helen 

Typhoon Helen, which formed on September 9, rapidly intensified to a  super typhoon on the 14th. It moved to the northeast, and steadily weakened until hitting southeastern Japan as a  typhoon on the 17th. It paralleled the Japanese coastline, and after turning northward it became extratropical on the 19th in the Sea of Okhotsk. Helen's effects caused 24 fatalities (with 44 missing) and 108 injuries.

Typhoon Ida 

On September 20, Tropical Storm Ida formed in the central Western Pacific. It moved to the west, rapidly strengthening to a  typhoon by the next day. Such winds are speculative, due to the lack of satellite or quality in measurements, but Ida was likely a formidable typhoon with a record low pressure (at the time) of 877 mbar. It became extratropical the next day, and dissipated on the 28th to the east of the country. Ida caused torrential flooding to southeastern Japan, resulting in over 1,900 mudslides. Damage along the coastline was extensive, including two small villages that were washed away completely. Nearly 500,000 were left homeless, 888 were killed, 496 were injured, and 381 were missing from the storm.

Typhoon June 

Typhoon June existed from September 20 to September 22. It briefly crossed the dateline similar to hurricane Patsy in the 1959 pacific hurricane season.

JMA Tropical Storm Twenty-four 

Tropical Storm 24 existed from September 24 to September 29.

Typhoon Kathy 

Typhoon Kathy developed just east of the Philippines on October 21. It moved across the islands and entered the South China Sea. There, the system strengthened, and subsequently dissipated on October 27.

Typhoon Lorna 

Typhoon Lorna existed from October 23 to November 3.

Typhoon Marie 

Typhoon Marie existed from October 26 to November 3.

Typhoon Nancy 

Typhoon Nancy developed near Palau on November 21. Nancy dissipated on November 26.

Tropical Storm Pamela 

Tropical Storm Pamela existed from November 30 to December 4.

Typhoon Olga 

Typhoon Olga existed from December 2 to December 8.

JMA Tropical Storm Thirty-one 

Typhoon 31 existed from December 9 to December 12.

Storm names

See also 

 List of Pacific typhoon seasons
 1950s South-West Indian Ocean cyclone seasons
 1950s Australian region cyclone seasons
 South-West Indian Ocean cyclone seasons: 1957–58 1958–59

References

External links 
 
 Japan Meteorological Agency
 Joint Typhoon Warning Center .
 China Meteorological Agency
 National Weather Service Guam
 Hong Kong Observatory
 Macau Meteorological Geophysical Services
 Korea Meteorological Agency
 Philippine Atmospheric, Geophysical and Astronomical Services Administration
 Taiwan Central Weather Bureau
 Digital Typhoon - Typhoon Images and Information
 Typhoon2000 Philippine typhoon website